Chimborazo is a populated place in the parish of Saint Joseph, Barbados. Chimborazo Hill in Chimborazo is one of the highest points in Barbados.

See also
 List of cities, towns and villages in Barbados

References

Saint Joseph, Barbados
Populated places in Barbados